is a puzzle video game developed by Taito for Nintendo DS in 2006-2007.

Reception

The game received "mixed" reviews according to the review aggregation website Metacritic. In Japan, Famitsu gave it a score of one eight, one six, one five, and one six for a total of 25 out of 40.

References

External links
 

2006 video games
505 Games games
Majesco Entertainment games
Nintendo DS games
Nintendo DS-only games
Puzzle video games
Taito games
Video games developed in Japan
Red Ant Enterprises games
Single-player video games